Jeevarathinam Rangaswamy (6 November 1921, Vellore (Tamil Nadu)) is a leader of Indian National Congress from Tamil Nadu. He served as member of the Lok Sabha representing Arakkonam (Lok Sabha constituency). He was elected to 8th, 9th and 10th Lok Sabha.

References

India MPs 1991–1996
People from Vellore district
1932 births
Living people
India MPs 1989–1991
India MPs 1984–1989
Lok Sabha members from Tamil Nadu